Christopher Orr (born 1967) is an American film critic and magazine editor. He has been a senior editor at The Atlantic since 2010.

Orr has also written for The New Republic, Salon, LA Weekly, and The New York Sun.

Bibliography

References

American film critics
American magazine editors
The Atlantic (magazine) people
1967 births
Living people
20th-century American journalists
American male journalists
21st-century American journalists